The Yamaha TT-R125 is a trail bike that Yamaha produced from 2000–present.  The names TT, TT-R, and XT have been used for semi off-road and street versions in different markets and in different eras. It is mainly used for family recreation and off-road trails. It has a soft suspension, wide seat and high ground clearance.

Variants
The TT-R125L version has larger wheels ( and ), with a  seat height, and a front disc brake.  Introduced in 2003, the TT-R125E has electric start.

The TT-R125LE combines both features of the L and E variants.

See also
 Yamaha TT-R225
 Yamaha TT-R230
 Yamaha TT-R250
 Yamaha XT225

References

External links
 

TTR125